WHO (1040 kHz "Newsradio 1040") is a commercial AM radio station in Des Moines, Iowa, United States. The station is owned by iHeartMedia and carries a news/talk radio format.  The radio studios are on Grand Avenue in Des Moines.

WHO broadcasts with 50,000 watts, the maximum power permitted for commercial AM stations.  It uses a non-directional antenna from a transmitter site on 148th Street South in Mitchellville, Iowa.  WHO dates back to the early days of broadcasting and is a Class A clear-channel station. During daytime hours, its high power and Iowa's excellent soil conductivity gives it at least secondary coverage of most of Iowa, as well as parts of Illinois, Missouri, Nebraska, Kansas, Wisconsin, Minnesota and South Dakota.  With a good radio, it can be heard at night across much of North America, but is strongest in the Central United States.  WHO is also heard on the HD Radio digital subchannel of co-owned KDRB 100.3 FM and is Iowa's primary entry point station in the Emergency Alert System.

History

Early years
While most radio stations in Iowa today begin their call signs with a K, WHO begins with a W, because the original dividing line was the western border of Iowa. WHO dates back to the early years of radio, when call signs were often only three letters long. The call letters were not chosen because they spell out the question "Who?" The government handed out call signs sequentially.

The studios were on the top floor of the Liberty Building in downtown Des Moines. The station was originally owned by Bankers Life, which is now the Principal Financial Group. After the FRC's General Order 40 reallocated frequencies in 1928, WHO ended up sharing time on the same frequency with WOC in Davenport. In 1930, B. J. Palmer, owner of WOC, bought WHO, and the two stations operated together as WOC-WHO until a new 50,000-watt transmitter near Mitchellville began operating on November 11, 1933. (WOC ceased broadcasting that day but returned on another frequency a year later.) Through most of its early years, WHO was a network affiliate of the NBC Red Network, broadcasting comedies, dramas, game shows, soap operas, sports and big bands.

WHO moved from 1000 AM to the current 1040 on March 29, 1941, as a result of the North American Regional Broadcasting Agreement. Today WHO is one of only two 50,000-watt AM radio stations in Iowa. The other is KXEL in Waterloo. However, WHO was originally a Class I-A, while KXEL was given Class I-B status, requiring a directional antenna at night, to avoid interfering with the other Class I-B station on 1540, ZNS-1 in Nassau, Bahamas.

For many years, WHO has used an owl as its mascot, an apparent play on its call letters, pronounced like an owl's call.

Ronald Reagan, WHO sportscaster

Future United States President Ronald Reagan worked as a sportscaster with WHO from 1932 to 1937. Among his duties were re-creations of Chicago Cubs baseball games. Reagan received details over a teleprinter for each play and would act as if he were in the stadium, reporting on the game while seeing it from the press box. Many radio stations used this re-creation system until sports networks became more common.

WHO-FM and WHO-TV
In 1948, WHO-FM 100.3 signed on the air. Originally WHO-FM simulcast most of the programming heard on 1040 AM. But in 1967, WHO-FM switched to classical music and beautiful music. 100.3 has changed formats and call letters several times since then and now broadcasts as KDRB, "100.3 The Bus." In 1954, WHO-TV began broadcasting on channel 13. Because WHO 1040 was a long-time affiliate of NBC, the TV station also affiliated with NBC.

WHO was continuously owned by the Palmer family for more than 70 years, until Jacor Broadcasting purchased the station in 1997. Jacor merged with Clear Channel Communications (now iHeartMedia) a year later. WHO and the other Clear Channel radio stations in Des Moines (KDRB, KKDM, KLYF, and KXNO) continued to share a building with WHO-TV until moving into a new facility in 2005.

Personalities and programming
Weekdays on WHO begin with "Max & Amy," a news and information show.  Two other local hosts are heard on weekdays, Jeff Angelo in late mornings and Simon Conway in afternoon drive time.  The rest of the schedule is made up of nationally syndicated shows, mostly from the co-owned Premiere Networks:  "Clay Travis & Buck Sexton," Sean Hannity, "Our American Stories with Lee Habeeb," "Coast to Coast AM with George Noory" and "America in the Morning" with John Trout.

Saturday mornings feature a local show, "Saturday Morning Live" with Emery Songer and Melanie Mackey.  Syndicated weekend shows include Kim Komando, Bill Cunningham and Joe Pags.  Shows on money, health, technology, pets and religion are also heard, some of which are paid brokered programming.  Some hours begin with Fox News Radio.

Herb Plambeck was a farm reporter for many years from 1936 to 1976. Talk-show host Steve Deace started his broadcast career at WHO.

Sports programming
WHO has been the longtime flagship station of University of Iowa sports. Jim Zabel, who joined WHO in 1944, was the play-by-play voice for Hawkeyes football and basketball games from 1949 to 1996. That is when the University of Iowa licensed exclusive rights to do radio play-by-play to Learfield Sports, which picked Gary Dolphin as the play-by-play announcer for Hawkeyes men's and women's basketball.

Until his death in 2013, Zabel remained with WHO as co-host (with Jon Miller of HawkeyeNation) of the Sound Off sports talk show that aired on Saturdays during Hawkeyes seasons, and as co-host of Two Guys Named Jim on Sunday nights with former Iowa State University football coach Jim Walden.

State Fair programming
WHO broadcasts its local shows from the Iowa State Fair for the duration of that event.

References
Stein, Jeff, Making Waves: The People and Places of Iowa Broadcasting. Cedar Rapids, Iowa: WDG Communications, 2004.

External links
 
 WHO radio historical artifacts from DesMoinesBroadcasting.com
 WHO-Tour of Transmitter and History

 

1924 establishments in Iowa
News and talk radio stations in the United States
Radio stations established in 1924
μWHO
IHeartMedia radio stations
Clear-channel radio stations